The Interim Bangsamoro Cabinet is the Bangsamoro regional government cabinet currently being held by interim Chief Minister Murad Ebrahim. It was formed on February 26, 2019 following the constitution of the Bangsamoro Transition Authority, the interim governing body of the region.

In February 8, 2022, Ebrahim ordered the ministers and their deputies to tender courtesy resignation while the director general of each ministry were directed to temporarily take over. Three new ministers, most of who assumed their post at an undisclosed date, took their oath on March 14, 2022.

On September 23, 2022, a new set of members took oath, most of which are reappointments.

List of ministers

Former members

Notes

References

Cabinets established in 2019
Ebrahim